Market Day may refer to

Market Day, an Ignatz Award-winning Graphic Novel by James Sturm
Business day
Trading day